Erol is a Turkish given name or surname meaning "brave".
This name is shared by the following people:

Given name
 Erol Alkan (born 1974), Turkish Cypriot DJ, artist and record producer
 Erol Erdal Alkan (born 1994), Turkish footballer
 Erol Bekir (born 1974), Macedonian-Swedish footballer and manager player
 Erol Bulut (born 1975), Turkish footballer
 Erol Bilgin (born 1987), Turkish weightlifter 
 Erol Büyükburç (1936–2015), Turkish pop music singer and composer 
 Erol Çevikçe (born 1937), Turkish politician
 Erol Erdinç (born 1945), Turkish classical pianist and conductor
 Erol Erduran, Turkish Cypriot educator and writer
 Erol Evcil (born 1966), Turkish businessman
 Erol Evgin (born 1947), Turkish pop singer, composer and film actor
 Erol Gelenbe, Turkish-French academic, computer scientist, electronic engineer and applied mathematician
 Erol Günaydın (1933–2012), Turkish theater and film actor
 Erol Güngör (1938–1983), Turkish sociologist
 Erol Iba (born 1979), Indonesian footballer 
 Erol Kaymak, Turkish Cypriot academic
 Erol Kemah (born 1961), Turkish sport wrestler 
 Erol Keskin (1927–2016), Turkish footballer
 Erol Mütercimler (born 1954), Turkish journalist, columnist and academic
 Erol Onaran (1934–2005), Turkish-American businessman
 Erol Otus, American artist and game designer
 Erol Ozensoy (born 1953), Turkish entrepreneur, industrialist and businessman
 Erol Sabancı (born 1938), Turkish billionaire banker
 Erol Sabanov (born 1974), Bulgarian-German footballer of Turkish origin
 Erol Sander (born 1968), Turkish-German actor
 Erol Taş (1928–1998), Turkish film actor
 Erol Togay (1950–2012), Turkish footballer 
 Erol Toy (1936–2021), Turkish writer
 Erol Tuncer (born 1938), Turkish engineer, bureaucrat and politician
 Erol Uenala, Turkish-Swiss industrial and metal musician

Surname
 Altan Erol, Turkish professional basketball player
 Cemre Erol (born 1992), Turkish volleyball player
 Didem Erol, Australian-born Turkish-American actress, model, and TV host
 Esra Erol (footballer) (born 1985), Turkish footballer
 Esra Erol (TV presenter) (982), Turkish television presenter. 
 Metin Erol (born 1987), Turkish footballer
 Safiye Erol (1902–1964), Turkish novelist

See also
 Errol (disambiguation), English given name

Turkish-language surnames
Turkish masculine given names
Bosniak masculine given names
Bosnian masculine given names